Caribbomerus is a genus of beetles in the family Cerambycidae, containing the following species:

 Caribbomerus asperatus (Fisher, 1932)
 Caribbomerus attenuatus (Chevrolat, 1862)
 Caribbomerus brasiliensis (Napp & Martins, 1984)
 Caribbomerus charynae (Micheli, 2003)
 Caribbomerus decoratus (Zayas, 1975)
Caribbomerus elieri Devesa & Santos-Silva, 2021
 Caribbomerus elongatus (Fisher, 1932)
Caribbomerus jaliscanus Heffern, Santos-Silva & Nascimento, 2021
 Caribbomerus mexicanus (Napp & Martins, 1984)
 Caribbomerus picturatus (Napp & Martins, 1984)
 Caribbomerus productus (White, 1855)
 Caribbomerus similis (Fisher, 1932)
Caribbomerus zayasi Devesa & Santos-Silva, 2021

References

Graciliini